Maipú may refer to the following places:

Argentina
Maipú Partido, an administrative division of Buenos Aires Province
Maipú, Buenos Aires, capital of Maipú Partido
Maipú Department, Chaco
Maipú Department, Mendoza
Maipú, Mendoza
Deportivo Maipú, an association football slub

Chile
Maipú, Chile

See also

Maipo (disambiguation)